Ben Goodger (born in London, England) is a British-New Zealand software engineer, formerly employee of Netscape Communications Corporation and the Mozilla Foundation and former lead developer of the Firefox web browser.

Goodger grew up in Auckland, New Zealand, and graduated from the University of Auckland in May 2003 with a bachelor's degree in Computer Engineering. He now lives in Los Altos Hills, California and is currently working for Google Inc., where he leads user experience for the Google Chrome project.

Footnotes

External links

 
Ben Goodger's personal weblog
Magpie — Ben's Firefox Extension (Maintained now by Christian Wallbaum)
Old Magpie — Ben's Firefox Extension info
Ben Goodger interview on FLOSS Weekly
Ben Goodger to Google on CNet News 
Kiwi leads effort to build a better browser (Paul Brislen, New Zealand Herald, 17 September 2004)
Unearthing the origins of Firefox (Paul Festa, CNet, 13 October 2004)

Google employees
Living people
Mozilla developers
Free software programmers
Open source people
Netscape people
New Zealand bloggers
University of Auckland alumni
People from Los Altos Hills, California
Year of birth missing (living people)